The Ahmadi Governorate (arabic:  محافظة الأحمدي) is the Second most populated Governorate of all the 6 Governorates in Kuwait. It is the Home of KOC, KNPC and much more Oil and Petrol companies.

Ahmadi consists of the following districts:

Abu Halifa
Al-Ahmadi
Egaila
Daher
Fahaheel
Fintas
Hadyia
Jaber Al-Ali
Mahboula
Mangaf
Riqqa
Subahiya,Kuwait
Sabah Al-Ahmad Sea City
Wafra

Government
Jabir Abdallah Jabir Abdallah II served as governor 1962–1985.

References

Governorates of Kuwait
Al Ahmadi Governorate